James Irvine may refer to:

 James Irvine (Pennsylvania politician) (1735–1819), politician, Vice-President (i.e. Lt. Governor) of Pennsylvania
 James Irvine (chemist) (1877–1952), chemist and Principal of the University of St Andrews
 James Irvine (educator) (1793–1835), second president of Ohio University
 James Irvine (landowner) (1827–1886), co-founder of the Irvine Ranch
 James Irvine (Quebec businessman) (1766–1829), early Canadian businessman and politician
 James Irvine (designer) (1958–2013), Milan-based designer
 James Irvine (painter) (1822–1889),  Scottish portrait-painter
 Jim Irvine (field hockey) (born 1948), Australian field hockey player
 Jim Irvine (footballer) (born 1940), Scottish former footballer

See also 
James Irvin (disambiguation)
James Ervin (disambiguation)
James K. Irving (born 1928), heir to J.K. Irving Ltd.
James Irwin (disambiguation)